Port Authority is a 2019 American-French drama film, written and directed by Danielle Lessovitz. It stars Fionn Whitehead, Leyna Bloom, McCaul Lombardi and Louisa Krause. Martin Scorsese serves as an executive producer under his Sikelia Productions banner. It had its world premiere at the Cannes Film Festival in the  section on May 18, 2019. It was released in France on September 25, 2019, by ARP Selection, and was released in the United States on May 28, 2021, by Momentum Pictures.

Plot
A 20-year-old Midwesterner arrives in New York City, and catches eyes with a young woman, leading to the two falling in love, and discovering that she is a trans woman.

Cast
 Fionn Whitehead as Paul
 Leyna Bloom as Wye
 McCaul Lombardi as Lee
 Devon Carpenter as Tekay
 Eddie Bloom as Eddie
 Louisa Krause as Sara
 Christopher Quarles as Mother McQueen
 Taliek Jeqon as Dante McQueen

Production
In October 2018, it was announced Fionn Whitehead, Leyna Bloom and McCaul Lombardi had joined the cast of the film, with Danielle Lessovitz directing from a screenplay she wrote. Martin Scorsese will serve as an executive producer under his Sikelia Productions banner, with MUBI serving as a producer.

The film's title Port Authority refers to the Port Authority Bus Terminal, the arrival point of Paul in the film as he seeks a better life in New York; Bloom said that this reflected her own journey from the Midwest to the station in the city at seventeen. Lessovitz also explained that the station is often a place of congregation and work for queer women of color in New York, as well as providing a sense of the transient because of the station's primary function.

As well as being a black trans actress from the Midwest, Bloom is also a real-life drag ball house mother.

Release
The film had its world premiere at the Cannes Film Festival in the Un Certain Regard section on May 18, 2019. It was released in France on September 25, 2019, by ARP Selection. It was released in the United States on May 28, 2021, by Momentum Pictures.

Reception
The site's critical consensus reads, "Although Port Authority frustrates with its inaccurate portrayal of the culture it attempts to represent, it remains an absorbing and well-acted drama." On Metacritic, the film holds a rating of 61 out of 100, based on 13 critics, indicating "generally favorable reviews".

Accolades

References

External links
 
 
 

2019 films
2019 drama films
2019 LGBT-related films
American drama films
Ball culture
Films set in New York City
French drama films
2010s English-language films
American LGBT-related films
French LGBT-related films
LGBT-related drama films
Films about trans women
Films produced by Martin Scorsese
2010s American films
2010s French films